Gregory David Roberts (born Gregory John Peter Smith; 1952) is an Australian author best known for his novel Shantaram. He is a former heroin addict and convicted bank robber who escaped from Pentridge Prison in 1980 and fled to India, where he lived for ten years.

Life
Roberts reportedly became addicted to heroin after his marriage ended and he lost custody of his young daughter. To finance his drug habit, he turned to crime, becoming known as the "Building Society Bandit" and the "Gentleman Bandit", because he only robbed institutions with adequate insurance. He wore a three-piece suit, and he always said "please" and "thank you" to the people he robbed.

At the time, Roberts believed that his manner lessened the brutality of his acts but, later in his life, he admitted that people only gave him money because he had made them afraid. He escaped from Pentridge Prison in 1980.

In 1990, Roberts was captured in Frankfurt, trying to smuggle himself into the country. He was extradited to Australia and served a further six years in prison, two of which were spent in solitary confinement. According to Roberts, he escaped prison again during that time but thought better of it and smuggled himself back into jail. His intention was to serve the rest of his sentence to give himself the chance to be reunited with his family. During his second stay in Australian prison, he began writing Shantaram. The manuscript was destroyed twice by prison staff while Roberts was writing it.

Writing career
After leaving prison, Roberts was finally able to finish and publish his novel Shantaram. The book's title comes from the name his best friend's mother gave him, which means "Man of Peace", or "Man of God's Peace".

There is debate as to how much of Shantaram is based on true events or is a conflation of real life and fantasy. On that aspect of Shantaram and of the follow-up novel, The Mountain Shadow, Roberts has stated:

Roberts lived in Melbourne, Germany, and France and finally returned to Mumbai, where he set up charitable foundations to assist the city's poor with health care coverage. He was also reunited with his daughter. He got engaged to Françoise Sturdza, who is the president of the Heart for India Foundation. Roberts also wrote the original screenplay for the movie adaptation of Shantaram.

In 2009, Roberts was named a Zeitz Foundation Ambassador for Community. Ambassadors help raise awareness and shape activities in their areas. In 2011, Roberts stepped aside as an ambassador due to the pressure of other commitments but continues to assist the Zeitz Foundation as a Friend.

His second novel, The Mountain Shadow, was released on 13 October 2015 by Little Brown.

In 2022, Roberts published the nonfiction book The Spiritual Path.

Music
In September 2020, Roberts released his debut single, "Drive All Night". This was followed by "Lisa Run Away". His debut album, Love and Faith, was recorded in Jamaica and released in December 2020.

Bibliography
 Shantaram (2003)
 The Mountain Shadow (2015)
 The Spiritual Path (2022)

Notes

References
 Rule, Andrew & Silvester, John, Underbelly 5 (2001),

External links
 
 G. D. Roberts talks about his writing at the India Non Fiction Festival, Youtube, 51 mins

Living people
21st-century Australian novelists
Australian expatriates in India
Australian male novelists
Australian memoirists
Australian bank robbers
Australian escapees
1952 births
Escapees from Victoria (Australia) detention
Criminals from Melbourne
People extradited from Germany
People extradited to Australia
Writers from Melbourne
21st-century Australian male writers
Convict escapees in Australia
People convicted of robbery
21st-century memoirists